This article provides details of international football games played by the Bahrain national team from 2000 to 2009.

Results

2000

2001

2002

2003

2004

2005

2006

2007

2008

2009

Head to head records

Notes
1 This match was originally scheduled for 13 October 2001 and started normally, but was interrupted at 25 minutes when Bahrain won 1–0 due to an electrical fire at Rajamangala Stadium.

References

Football in Bahrain
Bahrain national football team
2000s in Bahraini sport